The 1899–1900 Kansas Jayhawks men's basketball team represented the University of Kansas in its second season of collegiate basketball. The head coach was James Naismith, the inventor of the game, who served his second year. The Jayhawks finished the season 3–4.

Roster
Clyde Allphin
Frederick Owens
Herbert Owens

Schedule

References

Kansas Jayhawks men's basketball seasons
Kansas
Kansas Jayhawks men's basketball
Kansas Jayhawks men's basketball